Acrolophus directus is a moth of the family Acrolophidae. It is found in Mexico.

References

Moths described in 1912
directus